Ana Isabel Serradilla García (born August 9, 1978) is a Mexican actress known for her roles in television series such as La Viuda Negra, Drenaje Profundo and Linea nocturna. She also starred in the Mexican version of Desperate Housewives, Amas de Casa Desesperadas.

Biography
Serradilla is of Spanish descent with roots in Madrid. As a young girl, she dreamed of becoming an actress but was so shy she often could not even answer the phone. She studied acting at the Centro de Estudios y Formación Actoral and got her first job, Chiquititas in 1998. In 2012, she debuted in her first English-language film, Hidden Moon for which she won the Silver Goddess Award for Best Actress. Her theatre credits include Sin Cura and Blackbird.

In 2014, Serradilla portrayed drug lord Griselda Blanco in the TV series La viuda negra.

Filmography

Film

Television roles

References

External links
 
 Linea Nocturna Official Website (Spanish)

1978 births
Living people
Mexican telenovela actresses
Mexican film actresses
Actresses from Mexico City
Mexican people of Spanish descent